Purnell Pratt (October 20, 1885 – July 25, 1941) was an American film actor. He appeared in more than 110 films between 1914 and 1941. He was born in Bethel, Illinois and died in Hollywood, California.

Partial filmography

 The Great Diamond Robbery (1914) - Maria's Brother
 Seven Keys to Baldpate (1917) - John Bland
 The Lady Who Lied (1925) - Ahmed
 The Flame Fighter (1925) - Mike Turney
 Phantom Police (1926) - Tracy Downs
 Midnight Lovers (1926) - Wibley
 Alibi (1929) - Police Sgt. Pete Manning
 Thru Different Eyes (1929) - Dist. Atty. Marston
 On with the Show! (1929) - Sam Bloom
 Fast Life (1929) - Berton Hall
 Is Everybody Happy? (1929) - Stage Manager
 The Trespasser (1929) - Hector Ferguson
 Painted Faces (1929) - Foreman of Jury
 The Locked Door (1929) - Police Officer (uncredited)
 Puttin' On the Ritz (1930) - George Barnes
 The Furies (1930) - District Attorney
 Road to Paradise (1930) - Police Inspector Updike
 Common Clay (1930) - Richard Fullerton
 Lawful Larceny (1930) - Judge Perry
 Sinners' Holiday (1930) - Detective Sikes (uncredited)
 The Silver Horde (1930) - Wayne Wayland
 The Gorilla (1930) - The Stranger
 Paid (1930) - Edward Gilder
 Dance, Fools, Dance (1931) - Parker
 The Prodigal (1931) - Rodman Farraday
 Beyond Victory (1931) - Minor Role (uncredited)
 Bachelor Apartment (1931) - Herb Carraway
 The Public Enemy (1931) - Officer Powers (uncredited)
 Up for Murder (1931) - William Winter
 The Public Defender (1931) - John Kirk
 Traveling Husbands (1931) - J. C. Wilson
 The Gay Diplomat (1931) - Colonel George Gorin
 Five Star Final (1931) - French
 The Spider (1931) - Inspector Riley
 The Secret Witness (1931) - Capt. McGowan
 Ladies of the Big House (1931) - John Hartman
 Emma (1932) - Haskins
 Scarface (1932) - Publisher Garston 
 Grand Hotel (1932) - Zinnowitz
 The Roadhouse Murder (1932) - Inspector William Agnew
 The Famous Ferguson Case (1932) - George M. Ferguson
 Skyscraper Souls (1932) - Harrington Brewster (uncredited)
 Hat Check Girl (1932) - Collins (uncredited)
 False Faces (1932) - Jefferson Howe
 The Red-Haired Alibi (1932) - Police Inspector Regan
 The Unwritten Law (1932) - Stephen McBain
 Rasputin and the Empress (1932) - Officer Quieting Grand Duke Igor (uncredited)
 The Billion Dollar Scandal (1933) - Committee Chairman
 Pick-Up (1933) - Prosecuting Attorney
 I Cover the Waterfront (1933) - John Phelps
 A Shriek in the Night (1933) - Police Insp. Russell
 Headline Shooter (1933) - Eddie Edmunds - City Editor (uncredited)
 Midshipman Jack (1933) - Captain Rogers
 Love, Honor, and Oh Baby! (1933) - Marchall Durant
 The Sweetheart of Sigma Chi (1933) - Doctor
 The Chief (1933) - Al Morgan
 Son of a Sailor (1933) - Captain Briggs (uncredited)
 The Mystery Squadron (1933) - Lafe Johnson
 The Show-Off (1934) - John Preston (uncredited)
 Lazy River (1934) - Mr. Lodge - Attorney (uncredited)
 School for Girls (1934) - Inspector Jameson
 Men in White (1934) - Mr. Spencer (uncredited)
 The Witching Hour (1934) - District Attorney Robinson
 The Hell Cat (1934) - Butler
 Midnight Alibi (1934) - Wilson
 Name the Woman (1934) - Forbes
 Crimson Romance (1934) - Franklyn Pierce
 A Wicked Woman (1934) - Prosecuting Attorney (uncredited)
 The Band Plays On (1934) - Judge Bone (uncredited)
 The Secret Bride (1934) - District Attorney (uncredited)
 The Man Who Reclaimed His Head (1934) - Board Director (uncredited)
 The Winning Ticket (1935) - Mr. Powers
 Rendezvous at Midnight (1935) - The Mayor - Hamilton
 Death Flies East (1935) - Dr. Landers
 Behind the Green Lights (1935) - Detective Lt. Jim Kennedy
 The Casino Murder Case (1935) - District Attorney John Markham
 Black Fury (1935) - Henry B. Jenkins
 Ladies Crave Excitement (1935) - Amos Starke
 Diamond Jim (1935) - Physician
 Red Salute (1935) - Gen. Van Allen
 Waterfront Lady (1935) - Dist. Atty. Shaw
 It's in the Air (1935) - Horace McNab
 1,000 Dollars a Minute (1935) - Charlie
 A Night at the Opera (1935) - Mayor (uncredited)
 Frisco Waterfront (1935) - Dr. Stevens
 Magnificent Obsession (1935) - Hastings (uncredited)
 Dancing Feet (1936) - Silas P. Jones
 The Return of Sophie Lang (1936) - Thomas Chadwick
 Hollywood Boulevard (1936) - Mr. Steinman
 Straight from the Shoulder (1936) - James McBride
 Lady Be Careful (1936) - Father
 Wives Never Know (1936) - Higgins
 Murder with Pictures (1936) - Editor
 Wedding Present (1936) - Howard Van Dorn
 The Plainsman (1936) - Capt. Wood
 Let's Make a Million (1936) - Gilbert
 Join the Marines (1937) - Col. J. B. Denbrough
 Murder Goes to College (1937) - President Arthur L. McShean
 King of Gamblers (1937) - Strohm
 Night of Mystery (1937) - John F. X. Markham
 Forlorn River (1937) - David Ward (uncredited)
 High, Wide, and Handsome (1937) - Col. Blake
 Under Suspicion (1937) - Frank Rogers
 Rosalie (1937) - Ship Captain (uncredited)
 Come On, Rangers (1938) - Senator Harvey
 My Wife's Relatives (1939) - Mr. Ellis
 Second Fiddle (1939) - Abbott, the Editor (scenes deleted)
 Colorado Sunset (1939) - Mr. Hall
 Grand Ole Opry (1940) - Attorney General
 Pot o' Gold (1941) - Thompson (uncredited)
 Blossoms in the Dust (1941) - Texas Senator (uncredited)
 Ringside Maisie (1941) - Dr. Taylor
 Life Begins for Andy Hardy (1941) - Dr. Storfen (uncredited)
 Doctors Don't Tell'' (1941) - (uncredited)

References

External links

1885 births
1941 deaths
American male film actors
American male silent film actors
Male actors from Illinois
People from Clay County, Illinois
20th-century American male actors